Pseudogrinnellia is a genus of red alga in the family Delesseriaceae.

References

Delesseriaceae
Red algae genera